

Events 
April – George Frideric Handel suffers a probable stroke, resulting in the temporary paralysis of his right arm.
November 4 – Teatro di San Carlo, Naples, inaugurated with a performance of Domenico Sarro's Achille in Sciro.
 William Boyce conducts the Three Choirs Festival

Classical music 
Carl Philipp Emanuel Bach 
Harpsichord Concerto in G major, H. 405
Flute Sonata in E minor, H. 551
 Johann Sebastian Bach – Mass in G major, BWV 236
Christoph Graupner – Concerto for Chalumeau, Bassoon and Cello in C major, GWV 306
George Frideric Handel – Funeral Anthem for Queen Caroline, HWV 264
Leonardo Leo 
Cello Concerto in D major, L. 10
Cello Concerto in A major, L. 20
Cello Concerto in F minor, L. 40
Nicola Porpora – Il Gedeone (sacred oratorio)
Gottfried Heinrich Stölzel – Ehre sei Gott in der Höhe, H. 342
Jan Dismas Zelenka 
Requiem, ZWV 45 (attribution is contested)
6 Ave Regina Coelorum, ZWV 128
Il diamante, ZWV 177

Opera
Domenico Alberti – Endimione
Giovanni Bononcini – Zenobia
Riccardo Broschi – Merope
George Frideric Handel 
Arminio (first performed, composed in 1736))
Giustino, HWV 37 (first performed, composed in 1736)
Berenice, HWV 38 (completed, first performed)
Faramondo, HWV 39 (composed, first performed 1738)
 Johann Adolph Hasse – Asteria
John Frederick Lampe and Henry Carey – The Dragon of Wantley
Leonardo Leo 
L'Olimpiade
Siface
Jean-Philippe Rameau – Castor et Pollux
Nicola Antonio Porpora – Lucio Papirio
Domenico Sarro – Achille in Sciro
Antonio Vivaldi 
Catone In Utica
Oracolo in Messenia, RV 726

Publications
Joseph Bodin de Boismortier – 9 Sonatas and Chaconne, Op. 66
Nicolas Chédeville – Il Pastor Fido Sonatas (originally attributed to Vivaldi as his Op. 13)
Michel Corrette – Premier Livre d’Orgue, Op. 16
Charles Dollé – Pièces de viole, Op. 2
Giovanni Battista Ferrandini – 6 Sonatas, Op. 2
Charles-Joseph van Helmont – Pièces de Clavecin, Op. 1
Jean-Marie Leclair
6 Violin Concertos, Op. 7
Deuxième recréation de musique d’une execution facile, Op. 8 (Paris)
Pietro Locatelli – 12 Sonate da camera, Op. 6
Il Maestro di Musica – Pasticcio with music by Pietro Auletta, Giovanni Battista Pergolesi, Alessandro Parisotti
Ohrenvergnügendes und gemütergötzendes Tafelkonfekt, Augsburg. (includes works by Valentin Rathgeber)

Methods and theory writings 

 Carl Johann Friedrich Haltmeier – Anleitung zum Transponieren
 Jacques Hotteterre – Méthode pour la musette, Op. 10
David Kellner – Treulicher Unterricht im General-Baß
 John Frederick Lampe – A Plain and Compendious Method of Teaching Thorough Bass
 Johann Mattheson – Kern Melodischer Wissenschafft
 Jean-Phillipe Rameau – Génération harmonique, ou Traité de musique théorique et pratique
 Johann Adolph Scheibe – Der critische Musicus

Births 
January 3 – Heinrich Wilhelm von Gerstenberg, poet and librettist (died 1823)
January 19 – Giuseppe Millico, castrato singer, composer and music teacher (died 1802)
March 9 – Josef Mysliveček, composer (died 1781)
April 10 – François Giroust (died 1799)
September 14 – Michael Haydn, composer (died 1806)
September 21 – Francis Hopkinson (died 1791)
November 25 – Christian Friedrich Penzel (died 1801)
date unknown
William Paxton, cellist and composer (died 1781)
Frederick Charles Reinhold, operatic bass (died 1815)
Marguerite Morel, Ballerina, actress and singer.

Deaths 
February 12 – Benjamin Schmolck, Lutheran hymn-writer (born 1672)
September 22
Michel Pignolet de Montéclair, composer (born 1667)
Francesco Mancini, composer and music teacher (born 1672)
December 18 – Antonio Stradivari, violin-maker (born 1644) 

 
18th century in music
Music by year